Caesar ( English  Caesars; Latin  Caesares; in Greek:  Kaîsar) is a title of imperial character. It derives from the cognomen of Julius Caesar, a Roman dictator. The change from being a familial name to a title adopted by the Roman emperors can be traced to AD 68, following the fall of the Julio–Claudian dynasty.

Origins
The first known individual to bear the cognomen of "Caesar" was Sextus Julius Caesar, who is likewise believed to be the common ancestor of all subsequent Julii Caesares. Sextus' great-grandson was the dictator Gaius Julius Caesar. After he seized control of the Roman Republic following his war against the Senate, he adopted the title of dictator perpetuo ("dictator in perpetuity"), a title he only held for about a month before he was assassinated in 44 BC. Julius Caesar's death did not lead to the restoration of the Republic, and instead led to the rise of the Second Triumvirate, which was made up of three generals, including Julius' adopted son Gaius Octavius.

Following Roman naming conventions, Octavius adopted the name of his adoptive father, thus also becoming "Gaius Julius Caesar", though he was often called "Octavianus" to avoid confusion. He usually styled himself simply as "Gaius Caesar" to emphasize his relationship with Julius Caesar. Eventually, distrust and jealousy between the triumvirs led to a lengthy civil war which ultimately ended with Octavius gaining control of the entire Roman world in 30 BC. In 27 BC, Octavius was given the honorific Augustus by the Senate, adopting the name of "Imperator Caesar Augustus". He had previously dropped all his names except for "Caesar", which he treated as a nomen, and had adopted the victory title imperator ("commander") as a new praenomen.

As a matter of course, Augustus' own adopted son and successor, Tiberius, followed his (step)father's example and bore the name "Caesar" following his adoption on 26 June 4 AD, restyling himself as "Tiberius Julius Caesar". Upon his own ascension to the throne, he styled himself as "Tiberius Caesar Augustus". The precedent was thus then set: the Emperor, styled as "Augustus", designated his successor by adopting him and giving him the name "Caesar".

The fourth Emperor, Claudius (called "Tiberius Claudius Caesar Augustus"), was the first to assume the name "Caesar" without having been adopted by the previous emperor; however, he was at least a member of the Julio-Claudian dynasty, being the maternal great-nephew of Augustus on his mother's side, the nephew of Tiberius, and the uncle of Caligula (also called "Gaius Julius Caesar"). Claudius, in turn, adopted his stepson and grand-nephew Lucius Domitius Ahenobarbus, giving him the name "Caesar" in addition to his own nomen, "Claudius", His stepson thus became "Nero Claudius Caesar Augustus".

Dynastic title 

The first emperor to assume the position and name simultaneously without any real claim was Servius Sulpicius Galba, who took the imperial throne under the name "Servius Galba Caesar Augustus" following the death of Nero in AD 68. Galba helped solidify "Caesar" as the title of the designated heir by giving it to his own adopted heir, Piso Licinianus. His reign did not last long, however, and he was soon killed on orders of Marcus Salvius Otho, who became "Imperator Marcus Otho Caesar Augustus". Otho was then defeated by Aulus Vitellius, who became "Aulus Vitellius Germanicus Imperator Augustus", adopting the victory title "Germanicus" instead of "Caesar". Nevertheless, "Caesar" had become such an integral part of the imperial dignity that its place was immediately restored by Vespasian (Titus Flavius Vespasianus), who ended the civil war and established the Flavian dynasty in AD 69, ruling under the name "Imperator Caesar Vespasianus Augustus". 

The placement of the name "Caesar" varied among the early emperors. It usually came right before the cognomen (Vespasian, Titus, Domitian, Trajan, Hadrian); a few placed it right after it (Galba, Otho, Nerva). The imperial formula was finally standardised during the reign of Antoninus Pius. Antoninus, born "Titus Aurelius Fulvus Boionius Antoninus", became "Titus Aelius Caesar Antoninus" after his adoption but ruled as "Imperator Caesar Titus Aelius Hadrianus Antoninus Augustus (Pius)". The imperial formula thus became "Imperator Caesar [name] Augustus" for emperors. Heir-apparents added "Caesar" to their names, placing it right after their cognomen. They occasionally were given the honorific Princeps iuventutis ("First among the Youth") and were also addressed as Nobilissimus Caesar ("Most Noble Caesar").

Later developments

Crisis of the Third Century

The popularity of using the title caesar to designate heirs-apparent increased throughout the third century. Many of the soldier-emperors during the Crisis of the Third Century attempted to strengthen their legitimacy by naming their sons as heirs with the title of caesar, namely Maximinus Thrax, Philip the Arab, Decius, Trebonianus Gallus, Gallienus and Carus. With the exception of 
Verus Maximus and Valerian II all of them were later either promoted to the rank of augustus within their father's lifetime, for example Philip II, or succeeded as augusti after their father's death, for example Hostilian and Numerian. The same title would also be used in the Gallic Empire, which operated autonomously from the rest of the Roman Empire from 260 to 274, with the final Gallic emperor Tetricus I appointing his heir Tetricus II as caesar and his consular colleague. 

Despite the best efforts of these emperors, however, the granting of this title does not seem to have made succession in this chaotic period any more stable. Almost all caesares would be killed before, or alongside, their fathers, or, at best, outlive them for a matter of months, as in the case of Hostilian. The sole caesar to successfully obtain the rank of augustus and rule for some time in his own right was Gordian III, and even he was heavily controlled by his court.

Tetrarchy and Diarchy

On 1 March 293, Diocletian established the Tetrarchy, a system of rule by two senior emperors and two junior colleagues. The two coequal senior emperors were styled identically to previous Emperors, as Imperator Caesar NN. Pius Felix Invictus Augustus (Elagabalus had introduced the use of Pius Felix, "Pious and Blessed", while Maximinus Thrax introduced Invictus, "Unconquered") and were called the augusti. The two junior colleagues were styled identically to previous Emperors-designate, as nobilissimus caesar. Likewise, the junior colleagues retained the title caesar upon becoming full emperors.

The Tetrarchy collapsed as soon as Diocletian stepped down in 305, as emperors Constantine I and Maxentius fought to establish their own imperial dynasty. This system was abandoned (though the four quarters of the empire survived as praetorian prefectures) in favour of two equal, territorial emperors, one in the Latin-speaking West and other in the Greek-speaking East.

The title remained in use throughout the Constantinian period, with both Constantine I and his co-emperor and rival Licinius utilising it to mark their heirs. Constantine had four caesares at the time of his death: his sons Constantius II, Constantine II, Constans and his nephew Dalmatius, with his eldest son Crispus having been executed in mysterious circumstances earlier in his reign. He would be succeeded only by his three sons, with Dalmatius dying in the summer of 337 in similarly murky circumstances. 

Constantius II himself would nominate as caesares his cousins Constantius Gallus and Julian in succession in the 350s, although he first executed Gallus and then found himself at war with Julian before his own death. After Julian's revolt of 360, the title fell out of imperial fashion for some time, with emperors preferring simply to elevate their sons directly to augustus, starting with Gratian in 367. It would be revived in 408 when Constantine III gave it to his son Constans II and then in 424 when Theodosius II gave it to his nephew Valentinian III before successfully installing him upon the western throne as augustus in 425. Thereafter it would receive limited use in the Eastern Empire, for example, it was used in the designation of the future Leo II in 472 several months before his grandfather's death. In the Western Empire,  Palladius, a son of emperor Petronius Maximus, became the last person bearing the title caesar in 455.

Byzantine Empire 

Caesar or Kaisar remained a senior court title in the Eastern or Byzantine Empire. Originally, as in the classical Roman Empire, it was used for the heir apparent, and was first among the "awarded" dignities. From the reign of Theodosius I, however, most emperors chose to solidify the succession of their intended heirs by raising them to co-emperors. Hence the title was more frequently awarded to second- and third-born sons, or to close and influential relatives of the Emperor:  for example, Alexios Mosele who was the son-in-law of Theophilos (ruled 829–842), Bardas who was the uncle and chief minister of Michael III (r. 842–867), and Nikephoros II (r. 963–969) who awarded the title to his father, Bardas Phokas. An exceptional case was the conferment of the dignity and its insignia to the Bulgarian khan Tervel by Justinian II (r. 685–695, 705–711) who had helped him regain his throne in 705. The title was awarded to the brother of Empress Maria of Alania, George II of Georgia in 1081.

The office enjoyed extensive privileges, great prestige and power. When Alexios I Komnenos created the title of sebastokrator, kaisar became third in importance, and fourth after Manuel I Komnenos created the title of despot, which it remained until the end of the Empire. The feminine form was kaisarissa. It remained an office of great importance, usually awarded to imperial relations, as well as a few high-ranking and distinguished officials, and only rarely awarded to foreigners.

According to the Klētorologion of 899, the Byzantine caesars insignia were a crown without a cross, and the ceremony of a caesars creation (in this case dating to Constantine V), is included in De Ceremoniis I.43. The title remained the highest in the imperial hierarchy until the introduction of the sebastokratōr (a composite derived from sebastos and autokrator, the Greek equivalents of augustus and imperator) by Alexios I Komnenos (r. 1081–1118) and later of despotēs by Manuel I Komnenos (r. 1143–1180). The title remained in existence through the last centuries of the Empire. In the Palaiologan period, it was held by prominent nobles such as Alexios Strategopoulos, but from the 14th century, it was mostly awarded to rulers of the Balkans such as the princes of Vlachia, Serbia and Thessaly.

In the late Byzantine hierarchy, as recorded in the mid-14th century Book of Offices of pseudo-Kodinos, the rank continued to come after the sebastokratōr. Pseudo-Kodinos further records that the caesar was equal in precedence to the panhypersebastos, another creation of Alexios I, but that Emperor Michael VIII Palaiologos (r. 1259–1282) had raised his nephew Michael Tarchaneiotes to the rank of protovestiarios and decreed that to come after the caesar; while under Andronikos II Palaiologos (r. 1282–1328) the megas domestikos was raised to the same eminence, when it was awarded to the future emperor John VI Kantakouzenos (r. 1347–1354). According to pseudo-Kodinos, the caesars insignia under the Palaiologoi were a skiadion hat in red and gold, decorated with gold-wire embroideries, with a veil bearing the wearer's name and pendants identical to those of the despotēs and the sebastokratōr. He wore a red tunic (rouchon) similar to the emperor's (without certain decorations), and his shoes and stockings were blue, as were the accouterments of his horse; these were all identical to those of the sebastokratōr, but without the embroidered eagles of the latter. Pseudo-Kodinos writes that the particular forms of another form of hat, the domed skaranikon, and of the mantle, the tamparion, for the caesar were not known.

Ottoman Empire

"Caesar" is the title officially used by the Sasanid Persians to refer to the Roman and Byzantine emperors. In the Middle East, the Persians and the Arabs continued to refer to the Roman and Byzantine emperors as "Caesar" (in  Qaysar-i Rum, "Caesar of the Romans", from Middle Persian kēsar). Thus, following the conquest of Constantinople in 1453, the victorious Ottoman sultan Mehmed II became the first of the rulers of the Ottoman Empire to assume the title (in  Kayser-i Rûm). 

After the Fall of Constantinople, having conquered the Byzantine Empire, Mehmed took the title Kayser-i Rûm, claiming succession to the Roman imperium. His claim was that, by possession of the city, he was emperor, a new dynast by conquest, as had been done previously by the likes of Heraclius and Leo III. Contemporary scholar George of Trebizond wrote "the seat of the Roman Empire is Constantinople ... and he who is and remains Emperor of the Romans is also the Emperor of the whole world". 

Gennadius II, a staunch antagonist of the West because of the Sack of Constantinople committed by the Western Catholics and theological controversies between the two Churches, had been enthroned the Ecumenical Patriarch of Constantinople-New Rome with all the ceremonial elements and ethnarch (or milletbashi) status by the Sultan himself in 1454. In turn, Gennadius II formally recognized Mehmed as successor to the throne. Mehmed also had a blood lineage to the Byzantine Imperial family; his predecessor, Sultan Orhan I had married a Byzantine princess, and Mehmed may have claimed descent from John Tzelepes Komnenos. Ottoman sultans were not the only rulers to claim such a title, as there was the Holy Roman Empire in Western Europe, whose emperor, Frederick III, traced his titular lineage from Charlemagne who obtained the title of Roman Emperor when he was crowned by Pope Leo III in 800, although he was never recognized as such by the Byzantine Empire. 

In diplomatic writings between the Ottomans and Austrians, the Ottoman bureaucracy was angered by their use of the Caesar title when the Ottomans saw themself as the true successors of Rome. When war broke out and peace negotiations were done, the Austrians (Holy Roman Empire) agreed to give up the use of the Caesar title according to Treaty of Constantinople (1533) (though they would continue to use it and the Roman imperial title until the collapse of the Holy Roman Empire in 1806). The Russians, who defined Moscow as the Third Rome, were similarly sanctioned by the Ottomans, who ordered the Crimean Khanate to raid Russia on numerous occasions. The Ottomans would lose their political superiority over the Holy Roman Empire with the Treaty of Zsitvatorok in 1606, and over the Russian Empire with the Treaty of Küçük Kaynarca in 1774, by diplomatically recognising the monarchs of these two countries as equals to the Ottoman Sultan for the first time.

List of holders
Note: Caesars who later became Augusti and thus full emperors are highlighted in bold.

Byzantine nobles
Tervel, khan of the Bulgars, named in 705 by Justinian II
Nikephoros & Christopher, named on 2 April 769 by their father Constantine V
Alexios Mosele, likely named in 831 by his father-in-law Theophilos
Bardas, named on 22 April 862 by his nephew Michael III
Romanos I Lekapenos, named on 24 September 920 by the Byzantine senate
Bardas Phokas, named in late 963 by his son Nikephoros II
Romanos III Argyros, named on 9 November 1028 by Constantine VIII
Nikephoros Bryennios the Younger, named by his father-in-law Alexios I
John Doukas, named in 1074 by his brother Constantine X
George II of Georgia, named in 1081 by his brother-in-law Nikephoros III
Nikephoros Melissenos, named in 1080 by Alexios I
Isaac Komnenos, named in 1104 by his father Alexios I
John Rogerios Dalassenos, named  1130 by his father-in-law John II
Renier of Montferrat, named in 1180 by his father-in-law Manuel I
John Kantakouzenos, named in 1186 by Isaac II
Conrad of Montferrat, named in 1187 by his father-in-law Isaac II
Manuel Maurozomes, named  1200 by Alexios III
Leo Gabalas, named by Theodore I Laskaris (r. 1205–1221)
Constantine Palaiologos, named in 1259 by his brother Michael VIII
Alexios Strategopoulos, named in 1259 by Michael VIII
Roger de Flor, leader of the Catalan Company, named in 1304 by Andronikos II
John Palaiologos, named in 1326 by his uncle Andronikos II
Hrelja, likely named by John VI Kantakouzenos (r. 1347–1354)

Serbian rulers
Alexios Angelos Philanthropenos, named in 1373 by despot Thomas Preljubović
Manuel Angelos Philanthropenos, named in 1390 by despot Esau de' Buondelmonti
Grgur Golubić, named in 1347 by Stefan Uroš IV Dušan
Vojihna, named in 1347 by Uroš IV
Preljub, named in 1348–9 by Uroš IV
Uglješa Vlatković, named by Uroš V
Nikola Radonja, named by Uroš V
Novak, named by Uroš V

Ottoman rulers
Mehmed II, assumed title in 1453 (Kayser-i Rûm)
Bayezid II, inherited from predecessor
Selim I, inherited from predecessor
Suleiman I, inherited from predecessor
Selim II, inherited from predecessor
Murad III, inherited from predecessor
Mehmed III, inherited from predecessor
Ahmed I, inherited from predecessor
Mustafa I, inherited from predecessor
Osman II, inherited from predecessor
Murad IV, inherited from predecessor
Ibrahim, inherited from predecessor
Mehmed IV, inherited from predecessor

Legacy

Title (and name)

The history of "Caesar" as an imperial title is reflected by the following monarchic titles, usually reserved for "emperor" and "empress" in many languages (note that the name Caesar, pronounced  in English, was pronounced  in Classical Latin):

Afro-Asiatic languages:
 

Indo-European languages:
 , the archaic form   is rarely used today;
 Germanic languages:
  and 
 
 Indo-Iranian languages:
 
 , used in the title Kaisar-i-Hind ("Emperor of India") during the British Raj
Romance languages
 , used as a first name.
 Spanish, Portuguese and French, César: commonly used as first or second name.
 Slavic languages:
 
 ;
 ;
 
 ;
 ; however in the Russian Empire (also reflected in some of its other languages), which aimed to be the "third Rome" as successor to the Byzantine Empire, it was abandoned (not in the foreign language renderings though) as imperial style—in favor of Imperator and Autocrator—and used as a lower, royal style as within the empire in chief of some of its parts, e.g. Georgia and Siberia
 In the United States and, more recently, Britain, the title "czar" (an archaic transliteration of the Russian title) is a slang term used for certain high-level civil servants, for instance—"drug czar" for the director of the Office of National Drug Control Policy and "terrorism czar" for a Presidential advisor on terrorism policy. More specifically, a czar refers to a sub-cabinet-level advisor within the executive branch of the U.S. government.
 
 ;
 , also 

Austronesian languages:
 .

Kartvelian languages
 .

Turkic languages:
  (historical), Sezar (modern). Kayser-i-Rûm "Caesar of [Constantinople, the second] Rome", one of many subsidiary titles proclaiming the Ottoman Sultan (main imperial title Padishah) as (Muslim) successor to "Rum" as the Turks called the (Christian) Roman Empire (as Byzantium had continued to call itself), continuing to use the name for part of formerly Byzantine territory (compare the Seljuk Rum-sultanate).

Uralic languages:

In various Romance and other languages, the imperial title was based on the Latin Imperator (a military mandate or a victory title), but Caesar or a derivation is still used for both the name and the minor ranks (still perceived as Latin).

There have been other cases of a noun proper being turned into a title, such as Charlemagne's Latin name, including the epithet, Carolus (magnus), becoming Slavonic titles rendered as King: Kralj (Serbo-Croatian), Král (Czech) and Król (Polish), etc.

However certain languages, especially Romance languages, also commonly use a "modernized" word (e.g., César in French) for the name, both referring to the Roman cognomen and modern use as a first name, and even to render the title Caesar, sometimes again extended to the derived imperial titles above.

Yoruba language:
 
Translation of the name Caesar was first recorded in the first book translated to Yoruba, the Bible. The Caesar in the Bible refers to Emperor Augustus, who was referred to as Caesar. It was not used as a title for kings as it did not reach the language till the late 19th century and was not widely known till the 20th century. The main title for king was "Kábíyèsi", meaning one who cannot be questioned (Ká-bí-yò-èsi).

Historiography
Oswald Spengler used the term, Caesarism, in his book, The Decline of the West.

See also
 Augustus (title)
 Caesaropapism
 Khosrow (word)

References

Bibliography

Further reading 
 
 Pauly-Wissowa – Realencyclopädie der Classischen Altertumswissenschaft

Ancient Roman titles
Titles of national or ethnic leadership
Byzantine court titles
Imperial titles